Samuel Sumner Wilde (1771–1855) was an associate justice of the Massachusetts Supreme Judicial Court.

Wilde was born in Taunton, Massachusetts, and graduated from Dartmouth College in 1789, winning admission to the Massachusetts Bar in 1792.  He practiced law in several towns of the state's Maine District before settling in Boston after Maine achieved statehood in 1820.  In 1815 he was appointed to the Massachusetts Supreme Judicial Court (the state's highest), serving until he retired in 1850. He was the judge in the case of Baker v. Fales.

Wilde was a prominent attorney in Massachusetts and served as a justice of the Supreme Judicial Court. In 1814 he was elected as a representative to the Hartford Convention. Wilde was elected a Fellow of the American Academy of Arts and Sciences in 1825.

References 

 

People from colonial Boston
Massachusetts Federalists
1771 births
1855 deaths
Fellows of the American Academy of Arts and Sciences
People from Taunton, Massachusetts
Justices of the Massachusetts Supreme Judicial Court
Massachusetts lawyers
Dartmouth College alumni
19th-century American lawyers